The Indiculus superstitionum et paganiarum (Small index of superstitions and paganism) is a Latin collection of capitularies identifying and condemning superstitious and pagan beliefs found in the north of Gaul and among the Saxons during the time of their subjugation and conversion by Charlemagne.

From the original manuscript only the cover remains, which lists thirty chapters. The manuscript is held in the Vatican Library in a collection (Codex Palatinus Latinus 577) which probably originates from Fulda and thence traveled to Mainz, arriving there in 1479. From Mainz it went to the Bibliotheca Palatina in Heidelberg, and arrived in Rome at the latest in 1623. Preceding the Indiculus is the so-called Old Saxon Baptismal Vow. The text is edited in the Karlomanni Principis Capitulare, published by the Monumenta Germaniae Historica.

Date
Codex Palatinus Latinus 577 itself appears to have been copied ca. 800 in either Fulda or Mainz. Alain Dierkens argues, on the basis of word choice (the correspondence between the phrase superstitionem et paganiarum and the diction used by Boniface in his 742 letter to Pope Zachary) and a comparison between the content of the Indiculus and the conclusions of the Concilium Germanicum (744), that the Indiculus was indeed appended to or pertained to the decisions made at the Concilium Germanicum and the two consequent Frankish synods at Estinnes and Soissons. In other words, they were not the product of a late-seventh century scribe at Fulda, nor were the prohibitions aimed specifically or exclusively at the Saxons.

Significance
The index provides valuable insight into the religious culture of the pagan Saxons (from the Christian point of view) and into the daily practices of Christian missionaries working in that area. Since it is more or less contemporary with the activities of Saint Boniface in modern-day Germany, he has been called a "guiding influence" on its compilation. According to Alain Dierkens, the Indiculus, which he thinks derives from the "entourage" of Boniface, evidences the ongoing practice of pre-Christian practices, including divination, the use of amulets, magic, and witchcraft, and suggests that the church allowed or transformed certain practices which it had been unable to extirpate.

Editions
 "Forma Abrenuntiationis diaboli; Indiculus superstitionum et paganiarum". Georg Heinrich Pertz, Capitularia regum Francorum Vol. 1. MGH, 1835, 19-20.

See also
List of Frankish synods

References
Notes

Bibliography

Homann, Holger. Der Indiculus superstitionum et paganiarum und verwandte Denkmäler. PhD diss., Faculty of Philosophy, University of Göttingen, 28 November 1966.
Homann, Holger; Eckard Meineke, and Ruth Schmidt-Wiegand. Indiculus superstitionum et paganiarum. In: Heinrich Beck, Dieter Geuenich, Heiko Steuer (eds.), Reallexikon der Germanischen Altertumskunde Volume 15. Berlin / New York: de Gruyter, 2000. . pp. 369–384.
Saupe, Heinrich Albin. Der Indiculus superstitionum et paganiarum, ein Verzeichnis heidnischer nnd abergläubischer Gebräuche und Meinungen aus der Zeit Karls des Großen, aus zumeist gleichzeitigen Schriften erläutert. Programm der Städtischen Realgymnasiums zu Leipzig, 1890.

9th-century Latin books
Ancient Roman religion
Manuscripts of the Vatican Library
Paganism in Europe
Religious studies books
Saint Boniface
Sources on Germanic paganism
9th-century Latin writers
Writers from the Carolingian Empire